CCOC may refer to any of the following:

 Canadian Children's Opera Chorus
 Cork College of Commerce
 Cardinal characteristics of the continuum

See also 
List of acronyms: C